Sherwood Oaks is a middle class subdivision in the Spring Branch super neighborhood in Houston, Texas. The neighborhood is zoned to Stratford High School, Spring Forest Middle School, and Sherwood Elementary School, all operated by the Spring Branch Independent School District. Sherwood Oaks has roughly 300 Houses.

Overview
The total number of homes is 342. The neighborhood is filled with very mature trees, and many of the streets end in cul-de-sacs. Because the neighborhood only has three main entry points, cut through traffic is minimal. The Oak Stream entrance at the I-10 access road is the subdivision's main entrance, with Timberline Drive at Sherwood Forest and Hazelhurst at Sherwood Forest being alternate entrances.

As of March 2010, home values hover around $230,000. The subdivision has become increasingly popular because it is zoned to Stratford High School and because the homes resemble the more expensive West Memorial homes that sell from about $400,000. The houses along Scenic Ridge Drive back up to the Addicks Reservoir, a large greenspace area. The neighborhood has a very active homeowners association, private garbage pickup, and regular security provided by off-duty Harris County constables.

Neighborhood Amenities
Competition-size swimming pool with on-duty life guard
Swim team every April through June
Women's Club
Security patrol by off-duty constables
Private garbage collection with twice-weekly backdoor trash pickup and once-weekly heavy trash pickup
One of Houston's most active neighborhood watches, Citizens on Patrol

Main Entry Points
Oak Stream Drive South
Hazelhurst Drive North
Timberline Drive East

Freeway Access
Katy Freeway
Sam Houston Tollway

References

External links
 Sherwood Oak Swim Team

Neighborhoods in Houston